The 2014 Settimana Internazionale di Coppi e Bartali was the 29th edition of the Settimana Internazionale di Coppi e Bartali cycling stage race. It started on 27 March in Gatteo and ended on 30 March in Castello di Montecuccolo.

The race consisted of four stages, with the first one divided into two half-stages; the second half of the first stage was a particular team time trial, with every team split into two teams and final time taken on the fourth rider who crossed the finish line. A similar team time trial was also used in the 2013 edition of the race.

Team Sky's riders won four stages out of five, won the General Classification (with Peter Kennaugh, with another rider – Dario Cataldo – finishing in the second place), won the Points Classification (Ben Swift), and finished ahead of Teams Classifications. The others minor classifications were the King of Mountains Classification, won by Mirko Tedeschi, and the Young Rider Classification, won by Simone Petilli.

Race overview

Teams
The start list includes 25 teams (3 ProTeams, 9 Professional Continental Teams and 13 Continental Teams).

Stages

Stage 1a
27 March 2014 — Gatteo to Gatteo,

Stage 1b
27 March 2014 — Gatteo a Mare to Gatteo,  team time trial (TTT)

Stage 2
28 March 2014 — Sant'Angelo di Gatteo to Sogliano al Rubicone,

Stage 3
29 March 2014 — Crevalcore to Crevalcore,

Stage 4
30 March 2014 — Pavullo to Castello di Montecuccolo, individual time trial (ITT)

Classification leadership table

References

Settimana
2014 in Italian sport
Settimana Internazionale di Coppi e Bartali